Prempura is a village in the Bhopal district of Madhya Pradesh, India. It is located in the Huzur tehsil and the Phanda block. It is situated near Dobra, around 8 km from the Raja Bhoj Airport.

Demographics 

According to the 2011 census of India, Prempura has 3 households. The effective literacy rate (i.e. the literacy rate of population excluding children aged 6 and below) is 36.36%.

References 

Villages in Huzur tehsil